"No Man's Land" is a song written by Steve Seskin and John Scott Sherrill, and recorded by American country music artist John Michael Montgomery.  It was released in August 1995 as the third single from the album John Michael Montgomery.  The song reached number 3 on the Billboard Hot Country Singles & Tracks chart.

Content
The song is a ballad, discussing the challenge facing single mothers.

Critical reception
Deborah Evans Price, of Billboard magazine reviewed the song favorably, calling it a "well-written tune that salutes one of American culture's unsung heroes." She goes on to say that the song will "endear Montgomery to single moms everywhere."

Music video
The music video was directed by Marc Ball and premiered in mid 1995.

Chart performance
"No Man's Land" debuted at number 63 on the U.S. Billboard Hot Country Singles & Tracks for the week of August 26, 1995.

Year-end charts

References

1995 singles
1995 songs
John Michael Montgomery songs
Songs written by Steve Seskin
Songs written by John Scott Sherrill
Song recordings produced by Scott Hendricks
Atlantic Records singles
Songs about parenthood
Songs about divorce